Gustav Gustenau (born 1 June 1997) is an Austrian modern pentathlete. He competed in the men's event at the 2020 Summer Olympics, finishing 16th overall.

References

External links
 

1997 births
Living people
Austrian male modern pentathletes
Modern pentathletes at the 2020 Summer Olympics
Olympic modern pentathletes of Austria
Place of birth missing (living people)
Modern pentathletes at the 2014 Summer Youth Olympics